Aaron Seydel (born 7 February 1996) is a German professional footballer who plays as a striker for Darmstadt 98.

Career
Seydel, born to a Ghanaian father and a German mother, is a youth exponent from Mainz 05. He made his league debut with Mainz 05 II on 1 June 2014 against TSG Neustrelitz.

He made his Bundesliga debut for Mainz 05 on 27 November 2016 when he started a game against Hertha BSC and opened scoring in the 25th minute, Mainz eventually lost the game 2–1.

On 24 August 2017, Seydel was loaned to Holstein Kiel until 2018.

On 8 August 2018, he returned to Holstein Kiel on a loan deal until the end of 2018–19 season.

On 11 January 2020, Seydel was loaned to SSV Jahn Regensburg until the end of 2019–20 season.

References

1997 births
Living people
Association football forwards
German footballers
Germany youth international footballers
Germany under-21 international footballers
Bundesliga players
2. Bundesliga players
3. Liga players
1. FSV Mainz 05 II players
1. FSV Mainz 05 players
Holstein Kiel players
SSV Jahn Regensburg players
SV Darmstadt 98 players
German sportspeople of Ghanaian descent
Footballers from Rhineland-Palatinate